The Nixons is the third full-length album by the American alternative rock band The Nixons. It was released on June 24, 1997 by MCA Records.

Reception

Deren Svendsen of AllMusic gave the album two stars. He states "In 1996, the Nixons appeared to be on the verge of becoming one of the next big post-grunge bands, due in large part to the hit single "Sister," an acoustic ballad that wore the band's Pearl Jam influences on its sleeve. They returned in the summer of 1997 with this self-titled album, yet anyone expecting an album further mining the sound of "Sister" is bound to be disappointed. Rather than capitalizing on their success, the Nixons have instead crafted a set of hard, grungier songs." He praised the track "Sad, Sad Me", but concludes by writing "Unfortunately, other than that one winner, this is strictly paint-by-number mid-'90s rock, with little to recommend to anyone except the most die-hard fan." Writing in Lollipop Magazine, Barbara Restaino was more positive and wrote that "the appeal is the fact that their songs are simply songs, not experiments or musings or conglomerations or fortified with vitamins and minerals or whatever."

Track listing

Personnel
Ricky Wolking – bass
Jesse Davis – guitar
Zac Maloy – guitar, vocals
John Humphrey – drums

References

1997 albums
The Nixons albums
MCA Records albums